Avrum Sherman (September 7, 1897 – September 16, 1973), pen name Al Sherman, was a Russian-American songwriter and composer active during the Tin Pan Alley era in American music history.  Some of his most recognizable song titles include: "You Gotta Be a Football Hero," "Now's the Time to Fall in Love" and "Lindbergh (The Eagle of the U.S.A.)."  Sherman is one link in a long chain of family members who were musical. Most notably, his sons, Robert and Richard (referred to popularly as the Sherman Brothers) were to join the ranks of America's most highly regarded songwriters.  Pairing up and mentoring the Sherman Brothers team has often been referred to as Al Sherman's greatest songwriting achievement.

Early life
Al Sherman was born into a musical Jewish family in Kiev, Ukraine, in what was then the Russian Empire. His father, violinist Samuel Sherman, fled a Cossack pogrom in 1903.  Samuel settled in Prague which was at that time part of the Austro-Hungarian Empire. He eventually found success working as a concertmaster, first violinist and intermittent court composer in the Royal Court of Emperor Franz Josef. Within a year or so of his arrival, Samuel's family came to live with him in Prague.

As a young boy, Al attended concerts in the royal court. Conspicuously he hid in the gallery wings while his father performed for the Emperor. Sherman would later remark that it was these moments which originally incited his interest in music. In 1909 the Samuel Shermans relocated to New York City.  In 1911, frustrated with the lack of work available, Samuel left his wife Lena and their five young children, Olga, Al, Edith, Regina and newborn Harold.  At age 13, Sherman quit school and became the family's chief breadwinner.  By age 16, he had taught himself to play the piano and was able to find work playing in bands.  Despite his parents' separation and the position it put him in, Sherman maintained a great respect for his father and kept in close contact with him until Samuel's death in 1947.

Despite youth and scant knowledge of English, his natural talent for piano improvisation soon earned him a reputation as a top "mood music" pianist. His services to improvise inspirational music were sought by many silent film stars including Pauline Frederick, Mae Murray and Olga Petrova. In 1916, Universal signed Al to do bit parts in silent films as well. He later appeared in motion pictures with Mary Pickford, Mary Fuller, Clara Kimball Young and William Powell.

Al's composing career began in 1918 when he became a staff pianist for the Remick Music Company. There, he worked alongside George Gershwin and Vincent Youmans. During this time Al also organized and directed a small orchestra which played in New York and Miami Beach.  He joined the American Society of Composers, Authors and Publishers (ASCAP) in 1919.

Personal life
In the summer of 1921, Al was at the piano, leading his orchestra when he met a silent film actress, Rosa Dancis. They married in 1923. Al and Rosa Sherman's elder son, Robert Bernard Sherman was born on December 19, 1925. Their younger son, Richard Morton Sherman was born on June 12, 1928. Both boys were born in New York City. As the Sherman Brothers, they proved to be Al's greatest songwriting achievement, forming one of the most formidable songwriting teams in family entertainment (Mary Poppins, Chitty Chitty Bang Bang, Bedknobs and Broomsticks).

Career
In the 1920s, 1930s and 1940s, Al collaborated with songwriters including Sam Coslow, Irving Mills, Charles O'Flynn, Al Dubin, Pat Flaherty, B.G. deSylva, Harold Tobias, Howard Johnson, Harry M. Woods, Alfred Bryan, Buddy Fields, Archie Fletcher, Al Lewis, Abner Silver, Edward Heyman, Buddy Feyne and many others. Al quickly rose to become one of Tin Pan Alley's most sought after songwriters. Between 1931 and 1934, during the last days of vaudeville, Al and several of his fellow hitmakers formed a sensational review, Songwriters on Parade, performing all across the Eastern seaboard on the Loew's and Keith circuits.  Some of Al Sherman's most well known songs also include: "Wanita", "Save Your Sorrow", "Lindbergh (The Eagle of the U.S.A.)", "Pretending", "On the Beach at Bali-Bali", "Over Somebody Else's Shoulder", "No! No! A Thousand Times No!!", "For Sentimental Reasons", "(What Do We Do on a) Dew Dew Dewey Day", "Nine Little Miles from Ten-Ten-Tennessee" and "Ninety-Nine Out of a Hundred (Wanna Be Loved)". Maurice Chevalier's American breakthrough hit was an Al Sherman/Al Lewis song entitled "Livin' in the Sunlight, Lovin' in the Moonlight" from the Paramount Picture The Big Pond. "You Gotta Be a Football Hero" has been played, sung and marched to since 1933 when Fred Waring and his "Pennsylvanians" introduced it on the radio.  The Sherman/Fletcher song "On a Little Bamboo Bridge" became a hit for Louis Armstrong. Artists who recorded Al Sherman songs include Benny Goodman, Ella Fitzgerald, Billie Holiday, Tommy Dorsey, Frank Sinatra, Al Jolson, Bing Crosby, Eddie Cantor, Rudy Vallée, Ozzie Nelson, Lawrence Welk, Peggy Lee, Patti Page, Duke Ellington and his Cotton Club Orchestra among many others.

Some of his most memorable songs include songs for major Broadway revues, including the Ziegfeld Follies, George White's Scandals, The Passing Show and Earl Carroll's Vanities.  Beside writing "Livin' in the Sunlight" for The Big Pond, Al also wrote for many other films including songs for the motion pictures: Sweetie, The Sky's the Limit and Sensations of 1945.  Al Sherman's style and settings are suggested by such song titles as "Got the Bench, Got the Park", "Woodland Reverie", "Never a Dream Goes By" and "When You Waltz with the One You Love". Although he would continue to write songs and musical compositions until his death, Al wrote his last big song in 1952, "Comes A-Long A-Love", and was sung by Kay Starr.

Last years
In 1973 the Associated Press wrote, "Al Sherman helped raise the spirits of a Depression-era generation with his hit 'Now's the Time to Fall in Love'. Al wrote more than five hundred songs but gained his greatest fame for that happy tune." Always capable of finding the "silver lining", "Potatoes Are Cheaper" became Al's signature song. In 1973 he wrote his autobiography entitling it Potatoes Are Cheaper for this reason.

Al Sherman died in Los Angeles, California, on September 16, 1973, at the age of 76.

Posthumous achievements
In 1983, Sherman's song, "He's So Unusual" was chosen as the title song of Cyndi Lauper's signature album, She's So Unusual. She's So Unusual catapulted Lauper to stardom with such hits as "Girls Just Want To Have Fun", "She Bop" and "Time After Time".  Lauper's rendition of "He's So Unusual" was a clear homage to the original 1920s production, even going so far as to feature scratches and hisses on the track, making it sound even more like the original 78 record.  She's So Unusual won its sole Grammy Award in the category of Best Album Package, the concept of which clearly finding foundation on the title of the Sherman's song. As of 2002 She's So Unusual has sold more than 16 million copies worldwide. The album peaked at #4 on the Billboard pop albums chart (US). In 2003, the album was ranked number 494 on Rolling Stone magazine's list of 500 Greatest Albums of All Time.  In 2013, the album was ranked number 63 on Rolling Stone magazine's list of the 100 Greatest Debut Albums of All Time.

Alongside his sons Robert and Richard, Al Sherman became the subjects of a London musical concert, A Spoonful of Sherman narrated by Sherman's grandson, Robert J. Sherman. A Double CD of A Spoonful of Sherman was released by SimG Records in 2015. A Spoonful of Sherman was revived twice in London, once in 2014 and then in 2017 and then completely reworked once again as a musical stage show revue in 2018 touring the UK and Ireland.

See also
:Category:Songs written by Al Sherman

References

External links
 Sherman Music
 
 Al Sherman at SoundUnwound
 Al Sherman recordings at the Discography of American Historical Recordings.

1897 births
1973 deaths
American musical theatre composers
American musical theatre lyricists
American male songwriters
Burials at Mount Sinai Memorial Park Cemetery
Composers for piano
Emigrants from the Russian Empire to the United States
Jewish American songwriters
Members of the American Academy of Arts and Letters
Musicians from New York City
Al
Al
Vaudeville performers
20th-century American male musicians
American people of Ukrainian-Jewish descent